Eilema unipuncta is a moth of the subfamily Arctiinae. It is found in Palestine.

References

 Natural History Museum Lepidoptera generic names catalog

unipuncta